Mauricio Márquez (born 20 March 2001), is a Venezuelan professional soccer player who plays as a forward for Zamora.

References

External links

2001 births
Living people
Association football forwards
Venezuelan Primera División players
Zamora FC players

Venezuelan footballers